Charapozelia is a genus of bristle flies in the family Tachinidae. There is at least one described species in Charapozelia, C. fulviventris.

Distribution
Peru.

References

Dexiinae
Tachinidae genera
Diptera of South America
Taxa named by Charles Henry Tyler Townsend